Rhynchosia tomentosa, commonly known as the twining snoutbean is a species of plant in the legume family. It is native to the Southeastern United States, where it is primarily found in dry, open woodlands and sandhills.

It is a perennial that produces yellow flowers in the summer.

References

tomentosa
Phaseoleae